The Oldsmobile L-Series, or the Oldsmobile 8, was built from the 1932 through 1938. Oldsmobile hadn't offered a full-sized luxury flagship since the cancellation of the Oldsmobile Light Eight in 1923, and the Viking upscale companion brand to Oldsmobile didn't sell very well, being cancelled after two years. The 1933 model introduced a completely new body style influenced by the "streamlined" appearance, and it was shared with all GM brands due to GM's Art and Color Studio headed by Harley Earl. The appearance showed influences of Chrysler and Lincoln-Zephyr vehicles, and all Oldsmobiles were manufactured in Lansing, Michigan. Due to the popularity of the Oldsmobile F-Series, Oldsmobile recognized an opportunity to sell a similar sized alternative to the Buick Super, the Cadillac Series 355, and the "junior" companion brand LaSalle a platform the L-Series shared on the GM C platform. It was replaced by the Oldsmobile Series 90 introduced in 1938, and it was exported to Japan as a knock down kit and assembled at Osaka Assembly in Osaka, Japan.

L-32 through L-38

The L-Series was equipped with a side-valve,  straight eight-cylinder engine developing 87 bhp. All four wheels now offered as standard equipment hydraulic drum brakes, and in 1933 wooden spoked wheels were permanently discontinued with pressed steel discs instead. The retail price listed for a 1938 L-38 4-door Trunked Sedan was US$1,107 ($ in  dollars ). 1933 was the first year all GM vehicles were installed with optional vent windows which were initially called “No Draft Individually Controlled Ventilation” later renamed "Ventiplanes" which the patent application was filed on Nov. 28, 1932. It was assigned to the Ternstedt Manufacturing Company, a GM subsidiary that manufactured components for Fisher Body

See also
1935 Buick Roadmaster
1935 Cadillac Series 355
1936 Cadillac Series 60

References

L-Series
1930s cars